Carole Catlin Smitherman (born 1952) is a Jefferson County Circuit Court Judge.  Smitherman served in 2009 as the 31st Mayor of Birmingham, Alabama and spent several years as a member of the City Council before resigning to assume her current judicial position.

Biography 
Smitherman grew up in Birmingham. She and her brother were raised by her grandmother, an instructor at Lawson State Community College. Smitherman often touts her childhood friendship with former United States Secretary of State Condoleezza Rice. She graduated from Spelman College in Atlanta, Georgia in 1973. She went on to earn her Juris Doctor at Miles Law School, graduating first in her class in 1979. Smitherman is married to Alabama State Senator Rodger Smitherman.

Carole Smitherman was first elected to the Birmingham City Council in 2001 and has been re-elected twice. She campaigned unsuccessfully for the mayor's office in 2003, 2007, and 2009.

As President of the Birmingham City Council, she assumed the office of mayor when Larry Langford was convicted of 60 counts of bribery and related charges on October 28, 2009. A month later, she then lost the position when the new council convened on November 24, 2009, and elected Roderick Royal as council president on a 5–4 vote, thus automatically making Royal the acting mayor. Smitherman later lost her election bid as mayor in a special election following Langford's conviction.

Carole Smitherman was Birmingham's first African-American female mayor. She also was the first African-American woman hired as a deputy district attorney in Jefferson County and first African American female Municipal and Circuit Court Judge in Birmingham. Smitherman also served as a municipal prosecutor for the city of Irondale, Alabama. She was elected to her current judicial office in 2012, after beating attorney Pat Thetford. The seat handles civil matters and controversy over $10,000.

References 

1952 births
Living people
Mayors of Birmingham, Alabama
Alabama city council members
African-American judges
African-American mayors in Alabama
Women mayors of places in Alabama
Women in Alabama politics
Spelman College alumni
Miles Law School alumni
People from Jefferson County, Alabama
People from Irondale, Alabama
Alabama state court judges
Women city councillors in Alabama
African-American city council members in Alabama
African-American women mayors